Howdy Moon was the sole album by the band Howdy Moon, released in 1974. The band included Valerie Carter, Richard Hovey and Jon Lind. The trio of friends moved to Los Angeles where they were signed by A&M Records and played at The Troubadour. Many of the musicians from the band Little Feat are featured on the album.

After Howdy Moon disbanded, Lowell George produced Just a Stone's Throw Away, Valerie Carter's first solo album. The song "Cook With Honey", written by Carter, was also a minor hit for Judy Collins.

Track listing
"Lovelight" (Richard Hovey) - 2:53
"Cheyenne Autumn" (Jon Lind) - 3:14
"I'm Alone" (Valerie Carter, Richard Hovey) - 3:18
"Nora Lee" (Eric Eisner) - 3:39
"Runaway" (Richard Hovey) - 2:35
"And You Never Knew" (Ed Brandon, Valerie Carter) - 3:45
"Machine" (Richard Hovey) - 2:28
"Cook With Honey" (Valerie Carter) - 4:16
"For Tonight" (Richard Hovey) - 3:59
"Mill Stream" (Jon Lind, Francine Tacker) - 2:35

Personnel

Howdy Moon
Valerie Carter - vocals
Richard Hovey - guitar, acoustic guitar, vocals
Jon Lind - guitar, acoustic guitar, vocals
with:
Van Dyke Parks - piano
John Sebastian - autoharp, harmonica
Lowell George - flute, electric guitar, Moog synthesizer, slide guitar, backing vocals
Sam Clayton - congas
Roy Estrada - bass guitar
Wilton Felder - bass guitar
David Parlato - bass guitar
Andrew Gold - electric guitar
Arthur Adams - electric guitar
Dennis Budimir - acoustic and electric guitar
Bobbye Hall - congas
Richie Hayward - drums
Milt Holland - congas, percussion
Jim Keltner - drums
Sneaky Pete Kleinow - pedal steel	
Gary Mallaber - drums
David Paich - arranger, string arrangements
Bill Payne - Moog synthesizer, piano
Gordon DeWitty - electric piano
Chuck Rainey - bass guitar
Mike Utley - organ
Fred White - drums
John Bergamo - tabla

Technical
Brian Dall'Armi, Ric Tarantini, Tommy Vicari - engineer
John Haeny - mixing

References

External links

1974 debut albums
Folk rock albums
Albums produced by Lowell George
A&M Records albums